The Return of the Manticore is a 4-disc retrospective on the career of the band Emerson, Lake & Palmer. It was released in 1993, and features several new recordings of previously released songs, most notably a studio recording of "Pictures at an Exhibition," presented in Dolby Surround Sound. Also, a live recording of Dave Brubeck's "Rondo" features on disc 2; the track, although performed by ELP in concert from the band's inception (as it had been by Keith Emerson's previous band The Nice), was previously unreleased on any live or studio album by ELP. This rendition was recorded at the Lyceum Theatre on December 9, 1970.

The box set is a fairly comprehensive cross-section of the band's history, offering tracks from all of ELP's studio and live albums (at the time of release), as well as new ELP renditions of hits previously recorded by bands they were members of prior to forming ELP.

The set's original release was part of a wave of remastered releases under the band's new label Victory Music. After that label became defunct, the set was re-released on Rhino Records.

Track listing

Personnel
Keith Emerson: keyboards
Greg Lake: vocals, acoustic and electric guitars, bass
Carl Palmer: drums, percussion

Production
Disc One
Keith Olsen-Producer
Brian Foraker-Engineer
Greg Fulginiti-Mastering

References

Albums produced by Eddy Offord
Albums produced by Greg Lake
Albums produced by Keith Emerson
Albums produced by Carl Palmer
Emerson, Lake & Palmer compilation albums
1993 compilation albums